The Cannone da 90/53 was an Italian-designed cannon used both in an anti-aircraft role and as an anti-tank gun during World War II. It was one of the most successful anti-aircraft guns to see service during the conflict.

The designation "90/53" meant that the gun had a 90 mm caliber and a barrel 53 caliber-lengths long.

History

Naval version 
In 1938, after a development period, the Ansaldo company produced a new heavy AA gun for the Regia Marina, to replace the obsolescent Škoda 10 cm K10 and K11 used for that role on Italian warships; initially 48 calibers long, it was eventually brought to 50 calibers.

The Cannone da 90/50 Ansaldo Model 1938 and OTO Model 1939 had an autofretted monobloc barrel with a screwed-on breech ring containing the horizontal sliding breech block and seatings for the recoil and run-out cylinders. The most interesting part of the weapon was the single quadriaxial mounting designed for it: those were pre-stabilized, with a complex system controlled by 11 gyros, with two electric motors providing the necessary RPC; the whole complex was enclosed in an oval shielded turret, mainly to protect it from the blast effects from the battleship's main caliber guns. The turret weighed some 20 tons, and the practical rate of fire was 12 rounds per minute. After testing on the armoured cruiser San Giorgio, the 90/50 was fitted on the new Littorio-class battleships and the two Andrea Doria-class battleships being rebuilt, for a respective total of 12 and 10 mountings.

This system has been described as too advanced and ahead of its day, and, while ballistically the gun had good performance, the mountings proved delicate. In the Andrea Doria-class battleships the electrical RPC motors were removed in 1942 because of water damage; on the Littorio-class battleships, where the mountings were placed higher, the RPC was retained. Early rounds tended to be flawed and fragment into very small pieces, reducing their effectiveness, although improved rounds were issued during the war.

After the war, guns from the Italian battleship Vittorio Veneto were assigned to Yugoslavia as a part of war reparations. They were mounted on a coastal artillery battery on island Žirje off Šibenik as a part of the Cold War defense strategy. Two 90/53 cannons saw action in September 1991 during the Croatian War of Independence, deterring Yugoslav People's Army attack on Šibenik and blocking 34 Yugoslav Navy's patrol boats and minesweepers which were later captured by Croatian forces in the inner harbor.

Land version 

The Cannone da 90/53, derived from the naval version, was also designed by Ansaldo, with the first examples being produced in 1939. The original plan was for the gun to be manufactured in three variants:

 The Modello 41P was for static emplacement; 1,087 were ordered.
 The Modello 41C was to be towed; 660 were ordered.
 57 were ordered to be mounted on heavy trucks designated autocannoni da 90/53.

Italian industry was not up to producing these quantities and by the end of production in July 1943 only 539 guns had been delivered, including 48 converted for use on the Semovente 90/53 heavy tank destroyer; some, owing to delays in producing the adequate mountings, were fitted on makeshift ones or on the flatbed of trucks like the Lancia 3Ro and the Breda 52 and were designated Autocannone Breda 52 da 90/53.

Drawing upon the German experience with the comparable 8.8 cm FlaK 18, the gun was also used as field artillery in the indirect fire role or as an anti-tank gun.

After Italy surrendered, guns captured by Wehrmacht forces were designated 9-cm Flak 41(i) or 9-cm Flak 309/1(i). Some of these guns were used for the air defence of Germany, while others were kept in service in Italy.

Characteristics 
 Calibre: 90 mm (3.54 in)
 Barrel length: 4.736m (15 ft 6.5 in)
 Travelling weight: 8,950 kg (19,731 lbs)
 Weight in action: 6,240 kg (13,757 lbs)
 Elevation: -2° to +85°
 Traverse: 360°
 Muzzle velocity: 830 m/s (2,723 ft/s)
 Maximum ceiling: 12,000 m (39,370 ft)
 Shell weight: 10.33 kg (22.77 lbs)
 Rate of fire: 19 RPM

See also 

 Cannone da 75/46 C.A. modello 34
 Italian Army equipment in World War II

Weapons of comparable role, performance and era 

8.8 cm Flak 18/36/37/41
QF 3.7-inch AA gun
90 mm Gun M1/M2/M3
85 mm air defense gun M1939 (52-K)
Type 99 88 mm AA gun
Canon de 90 mm Modèle 1926

References

Bibliography 
 
 
 Artillery by Chris Chant, published by Amber Books,

External links 
 

World War II artillery of Italy
World War II anti-aircraft guns
Anti-aircraft guns of Italy
90 mm artillery
Gio. Ansaldo & C. artillery
Naval anti-aircraft guns
Military equipment introduced in the 1930s